Blue tree may refer to:

Blue Tree, a New York City boutique owned by actress Phoebe Cates
Bluetree, a Northern-Irish Christian band
The Blue Trees, a 2000 album by Welsh band Gorky's Zygotic Mynci
The Blue Trees (Dimopoulos), a performance and installation artwork by Konstantin Dimopoulos

See also
Blue ash Fraxinus quadrangulata, a type of tree
Blue spruce Picea pungens, a type of tree
Aoki (surname), a Japanese surname meaning "blue tree"